Bleddfa is a village in which lies on the road from Knighton to Penybont and is located in the  community of Llangunllo, Powys, Wales. It is 5 miles from Knighton, 57 miles (92 km) from Cardiff and 141 miles (226 km) from London.

Two hillforts belonging to around 200 B.C guard the village: Clog Hill above the village, and Llysin Hill to the west.

Bleddfa's Grade I listed church is dedicated to St Mary Magdalene and was built around the 13th century. Part of the nave was used in the past as a schoolroom.

See also
List of localities in Wales by population

References

Villages in Powys